Imagine This is the third album by the jazz ensemble Pieces of a Dream, issued in 1983 on Elektra Records. The album rose to No. 4 on the Billboard Traditional Jazz Albums chart and No. 16 on the Billboard Top Soul Albums chart.

Overview
Imagine This was produced by Grover Washington Jr.

Singles
"Fo-Fi-Fo" reached No. 15 on the Billboard Hot Soul Songs chart.

"It's Time For Love" reached No.19 on the Billboard Hot Soul Songs chart.

Tracklisting

References

1983 albums
Pieces of a Dream (band) albums
Elektra Records albums
Albums recorded at Sigma Sound Studios